Emmanuel H. Hugot is a French astrophysicist. known for his contribution to the developments of new technologies that help to improve telescopes used by professional astronomers around the world. This includes the development of more efficient curved detectors, but also improvements in the manufacturing methods for optical elements and active optics systems.  The technologies developed by Hugot and his group are used on the SPHERE instrument mounted on the European Very Large Telescope, as well as the coronagraphic instrument of the future NASA's Nancy Grace Roman Space Telescope, which are used to detect exoplanets.

Academic career 

From 2015 to 2019, he was head of the R&D group in optics and instrumentation at the Laboratoire d'Astrophysique de Marseille, gathering about 30 persons.  He obtained his PhD entitled “Astronomical Optics and elasticity theory” at the  Aix Marseille University, France in 2007. He supervised or co-supervised twelve PhD students between 2009 and 2021.

Awards 

 2014 awarded the young researcher (“Jeune Chercheur”)  prize by French Society of Astronomy & Astrophysics
 2016 received a 2 million euros starting grant from the European Research Council for his project ICARUS.
 2017 Hugot awarded the MERAC early career prize for new technologies by the European Astronomical Society for his unique and pioneering work on innovative astronomical instrumentation, based on active systems, freeform optics and curved focal planes.
 2017 awarded a Bronze medal by the French National Center for Scientific Research (French: Centre national de la recherche scientifique, CNRS) 
 2018 and 2019, the French Academy of Technologies selected him as a finalist for the Jean Jerphagnon Prize, awarding young researchers starting entrepreneurship in the field of photonics.

References 

Year of birth missing (living people)
Living people
French astrophysicists
Scientists from Marseille
Academic staff of Aix-Marseille University